The Wendell H. Ford Western Kentucky Parkway is a  controlled-access highway running from Elizabethtown, Kentucky to near Nortonville, Kentucky. It intersects with Interstate 65 (I-65) at its eastern terminus, and I-69 at its western terminus. It is one of seven highways that are part of the Kentucky parkway system. The road was renamed for Wendell H. Ford, a former Kentucky governor and United States senator, in 1998. Previously, it was simply the Western Kentucky Parkway, and often called the "WK Parkway" or "the WK" because of the acronym once used on its signs. The parkway carries the unsigned designation Kentucky Route 9001 (KY 9001) for its entire length.

Route description
The parkway passes the towns of Nortonville, Graham, Central City, Beaver Dam, Caneyville, Leitchfield, Clarkson, and Eastview. At exit 38 near Nortonville, at its western terminus, the parkway intersects with Interstate 69, which connects to Henderson, Interstate 24 westbound and Calvert City and Interstate 169, still signed as the Edward T. Breathitt Pennyrile Parkway, which connects the parkway to Hopkinsville and I-24. At exit 77 near Beaver Dam, the parkway intersects with Interstate 165 (formerly the William H. Natcher Parkway), which goes from Bowling Green to Owensboro. 

The highway crosses the line between the Central Time Zone and Eastern Time Zone at the border of Grayson and Hardin counties near Big Clifty.

Service Area
A service area, which featured a gas station and an Arby's restaurant until it abruptly closed in January 2017 and is now a convenience store, is located in the median, just west of the interchange with I-165. It is the only such service area in the entire Kentucky parkway system. (Two other service areas were once located on the old Kentucky Turnpike, a toll road from Louisville to Elizabethtown that predated the parkway system and later became part of I-65; they were closed when toll collection ended and the turnpike was officially absorbed into the Interstate Highway System.) It was initially reported that the closure was permanent, but a spokesperson for the Kentucky Transportation Cabinet (KYTC) soon indicated that the closure was temporary. In January 2017, KYTC started a bidding process to find a new vendor and reopen the service area. The bidding was won by regional convenience store chain Huck's, which reopened the area on March 9, 2018 and held a ceremonial reopening on March 16. According to the KYTC, it now features a total of 18 fuel pumps (10 regular, 8 diesel), plus a variety of prepared foods and a restaurant.

History

The original segment of the parkway was envisioned as a  toll road extending from Elizabethtown to Princeton. The bonds were issued in 1961 and construction wrapped up on the original  in December 1963 at a cost of $108,548,062. In 1968, construction wrapped up on a  extension of the Western Kentucky Parkway from Princeton to Interstate 24 in Eddyville at a cost of $5,554,468. The extension was originally proposed to be  but only  were constructed, possibly due to a design realignment of Interstate 24 near Eddyville.

Toll plazas 
The parkway was originally a toll road, as were all Kentucky parkways. State law requires that toll collection ceases when enough tolls are collected to pay off the parkway's construction bonds; that occurred in 1987. It is constructed similar to the Interstate Highway System, though sections do not currently meet all interstate design requirements.

Prior to toll removal, staffed toll plazas were located at mile 10 (now mile 78 of I-69) just west of Princeton, mile 24 (now I-69 exit 92) in Dawson Springs, mile 58 in Central City, and mile 107 in Leitchfield. An additional unmanned toll facility was located at Exit 94 near Caneyville, with tolls paid only by traffic exiting eastbound and entering westbound.

Interstate 69

On May 15, 2006, the section between the Breathitt (Pennyrile) Parkway at Madisonville and Interstate 24 became part of future Interstate 69; crews installed "Future I-69 Corridor" signs along this segment during the last week of May 2006.

From the Pennyrile Parkway in Madisonville to Interstate 24, the Western Kentucky Parkway officially became part of I-69 with the signing of federal highway legislation (see below) on June 6, 2008. By using an existing expressway for I-69, Kentucky officials avoided years of federal environmental studies since the upgrades are concurrent with the existing highway. The decision to use it ended talk of a new route for I-69 through Union, Crittenden and Livingston counties along the Ohio River.

On May 2, 2008 the U.S. House of Representatives passed HR 1195 (SAFETEA-LU Technical Corrections Act of 2008) which designates the Pennyrile Parkway from Henderson to Madisonville, and the Western Kentucky Parkway from Madisonville to I-24 at Eddyville as I-69.  It further designates the Audubon Parkway as a future spur (I-X69) of I-69 once necessary upgrades are completed.  President George W. Bush signed the bill on June 6, 2008.

In September 2011, Governor Steve Beshear, a native of Dawson Springs, announced an agreement with the Federal Highway Administration (FHWA), officially designating this section as I-69, effective September 30, 2011.  The Kentucky Transportation Cabinet unveiled I-69 signs along the route on October 25, 2011.

Signage and mile markers were replaced on the 38-mile (61 km) westernmost stretch of the Western Kentucky Parkway in mid-December 2012. The mileposts on the rest of the parkway remained unchanged with the original exit numbers.

In a project that began in 2014 and ended in late 2015, the interchange between the parkway and the Pennyrile Parkway was extensively modified to create a curve in the northwest quadrant (for eastbound-to-northbound and southbound-to-westbound traffic on I-69) to meet federal design requirements. Previously, I-69 thru traffic had to exit through tight ramps in a substandard cloverleaf.

Future

Interstate 569

On April 3, 2019, Representative James Comer and Senator Mitch McConnell introduced a bill that would designate  of the Western Kentucky Parkway as an interstate spur of I-69 from the I-69/I-169 (Pennyrile Parkway) interchange near Nortonville to the I-165 (Natcher Parkway) interchange near Beaver Dam. It was originally numbered I-369, but was changed to I-569 in December 2019. This section would require spot improvements to upgrade the parkway to interstate standards before the I-569 designation could be signed.

Exit list

See also

References

External links

Wendell H. Ford Western Kentucky Parkway at KentuckyRoads.com

9001
Interstate 69
Kentucky parkway system
Interstate 66
Transportation in Lyon County, Kentucky
Transportation in Caldwell County, Kentucky
Transportation in Hopkins County, Kentucky
Transportation in Muhlenberg County, Kentucky
Transportation in Ohio County, Kentucky
Transportation in Grayson County, Kentucky
Transportation in Hardin County, Kentucky